Alasdair McLellan (born 1974) is a British photographer.

Life and work
McLellan was born in 1974 in Doncaster, South Yorkshire.

He has worked for the fashion press Vogue UK, Vogue Paris, i-D, Love, Another Magazine, Another Man, Arena Homme +, Man About Town, 032c, Self Service, The Gentlewoman, Fantastic Man, and W.  He has photographed advertising campaigns for Louis Vuitton, Burberry, Topshop, Calvin Klein, Gucci, Miu Miu, Margaret Howell, Palace and Supreme. He has worked with the xx and his portrait of Adele was used on the cover of her album, 25.

Publications 
 Umbro by Kim Jones (2005)
 Ultimate Clothing Company (2013)
 Ceremony (2016)
 The Palace (2016)
 Blondey 15-21 (2019)

Exhibitions

Solo exhibitions
 Never Gonna Give You Up, Joerg Koch, Berlin/032c, London, 2012
 Alasdair McLellan and Lev Tanju: The Palace, Institute of Contemporary Arts (ICA), London, 2016
 Alasdair McLellan for Margaret Howell, London, 2017
 Here We Are, in collaboration with Burberry, London, 2017

Group exhibitions
North: Identity, Photography, Fashion, Open Eye Gallery, Liverpool, 2017; North: Fashioning Identity, Somerset House, London, 2017/2018

Collections
McLellan's work is held in the following permanent collection:
National Portrait Gallery, London: 2 prints (as of September 2020)

Music videos
 The xx – "On Hold"
 The xx – "Say Something Loving"
 The xx – "I Dare You"
 Saint Etienne – I've Been Trying to Tell You (visual companion to the 2021 album of the same name)

References

External links
 
 

Living people
1974 births
People from Doncaster
Photographers from Yorkshire
Fashion photographers